Xu Xiangyu (born 1999) is a Chinese chess player.

Career 

Xu earned his grandmaster title in 2017.

Competing in the Chess World Cup 2019, he upset his higher-rated compatriot Bu Xiangzhi in the first round and Ernesto Inarkiev in the second, before losing to Alexander Grischuk in the third round.

See also
Chess in China

References

External links
Xu Xiangyu games at 365Chess.com 

1999 births
Living people
Chess grandmasters